Russell Johnson (1924–2014) was an American actor.

Russell Johnson may also refer to:
Russell Johnson (cartoonist) (1893–1995), American cartoonist
Russell Johnson (acoustician) (1920–2007), architect and acoustical expert
Russell Johnson (sport shooter) (1920-1991), Olympic sports shooter
Russell Maurice Johnson (born 1947), Canadian serial killer
Russell S. Johnson, American politician who served in the 113th New York State Legislature
Russ Johnson (born 1973), baseball infielder
Russell Johnson, player on the 2010–11 Robert Morris Colonials men's basketball team
Russell Johnson, ice hockey player on List of Men's World Ice Hockey Championship players for Australia
 Jing Johnson (Russell Conwell Johnson, 1894–1950), pitcher in Major League Baseball

See also
Russell Johnston (disambiguation)